Mali Okič is a settlement in the Municipality of Cirkulane in the Haloze area of eastern Slovenia. It lies dispersed in the hills southwest of Cirkulane towards the border with Croatia. The area belongs to the traditional region of Styria. It is now included in the Drava Statistical Region.

References

External links
Mali Okič on Geopedia

Populated places in the Municipality of Cirkulane